Upputanni is an uninhabited island situated in the Gulf of Mannar.

Notes 

Uninhabited islands of India
Islands of Tamil Nadu
Islands of India